Ramón José Castellano (15 February 1903 – 27 January 1979) was the Argentine Archbishop of Córdoba, known to have ordained to the Catholic priesthood Jorge Mario Bergoglio, S.J., who later became Pope Francis.

Castellano was born in the community of Villa Dolores in the Province of Cordoba. On 18 September 1926 he was ordained as a priest, at the age of 23, for the then-Diocese of Córdoba, predecessor to the archdiocese. At the age of 42 he was appointed to be both the auxiliary bishop of Córdoba and the titular bishop of Flavias, for which he was consecrated as a bishop on 28 April 1945 by the then-Archbishop of Córdoba, Fermín Emilio Lafitte.

On 26 March 1958 Castellano was promoted to be Archbishop of Córdoba.  He held this post until his resignation on 19 January 1965. He was then named as the Titular Archbishop of Iomnium, but resigned from this office on 20 December 1970, at the age of 67.

Castellano held the title of Archbishop Emeritus of Córdoba until his death at the age of 75. His remains were buried in the cathedral of the archdiocese.

References

1903 births
1979 deaths
People from Córdoba Province, Argentina
20th-century Roman Catholic archbishops in Argentina
Roman Catholic titular archbishops
Roman Catholic archbishops of Córdoba
Roman Catholic bishops of Córdoba